Feock and Playing Place was an electoral division of Cornwall in the United Kingdom which returned one member to sit on Cornwall Council from 2013 to 2021. It was abolished at the 2021 local elections, being succeeded by Feock and Kea.

Councillors

Extent
Feock and Playing Place represented the villages of Carnon Downs, Devoran, Feock, Coombe and Playing Place, and the hamlets of Ringwell, Penpol, Harcourt, Goonpiper, Penelewey, Trelissick, Cowlands and Calenick. The division covered 1997 hectares in total.

Election results

2017 election

2013 election

References

Electoral divisions of Cornwall Council